Krahl is a German surname with Sorbian roots (kral = ″king″). Notable people with the surname include:

Hilde Krahl (1917–1999), Austrian actress
Jim Krahl (born 1955), American football player
Karl-Heinz Krahl (1914–1942), German World War II flying ace

German-language surnames